Cardcaptor Sakura: Clear Card is a Japanese anime television series based on the manga series of the same name written and illustrated by the manga artist group Clamp. It is a sequel to Cardcaptor Sakura and focuses on Sakura Kinomoto in junior high school. After the Sakura Cards turn blank and are rendered powerless, Sakura and her friends begin a quest to discover and capture the transparent cards using a new and much stronger mystical key and incantation to transform said key into the Dream Wand. Like the original series, Cardcaptor Sakura: Clear Card is directed by Morio Asaka, the screenplay written by Nanase Ohkawa of Clamp and animated and produced by Madhouse. The original main Japanese cast also return to reprise their roles.

An original video animation prequel prologue titled Sakura and the Two Bears, which bridges the stories of the Sakura Card arc and the Clear Card arc, had its world premiere at Anime Expo on July 1, 2017 and shipped in Japan as a DVD bundled with the special edition of volume 3 of the manga on September 13, 2017. The 22-episode television series aired from January 7 to June 10, 2018 on NHK BS Premium. Crunchyroll simulcasted the series with English subtitles, and Funimation simuldubbed the series on FunimationNow. From episodes 1 to 12, the opening theme is "Clear" by Maaya Sakamoto, and the ending theme is "Jewelry" by Saori Hayami. From episode 13 onwards the opening theme is "Rocket Beat" by Kiyono Yasuno and the ending theme is "Rewind" by Minori Suzuki.


Episode list

Notes

References

Episodes
Lists of anime episodes